The Netherlands was represented by Maywood, with the song "Ik wil alles met je delen", at the 1990 Eurovision Song Contest, which took place in Zagreb on 5 May.

Before Eurovision

Nationaal Songfestival 1990

Competing entries

Semi-finals 
The first semi-final took place on 16 February 1990. Ten songs competed and five songs, chosen by an expert jury, qualified for the final.

The second semi-final took place on 23 February 1990. Ten songs competed and five songs, chosen by an expert jury, qualified for the final.

Final 
The final took place on 10 March 1990 at the Congresgebouw in The Hague, hosted by Paula Patricio. Ten songs competed, and the winner was chosen by juries in the twelve Dutch provinces, who awarded 10 points to their favourite song down to 1 point to the least-liked. Maywood won by a 7-point margin, having been ranked first by four of the juries, two more than any other competing song.

At Eurovision 
On the night of the final Maywood performed 5th in the running order, following Turkey and preceding Luxembourg. At the close of voting "Ik wil alles met je delen" had received 25 points from 10 countries, placing the Netherlands 15th of the 22 entries. The Dutch jury awarded its 12 points to France.

The Dutch conductor at the contest was Harry van Hoof.

Voting

References

External links 
 Netherlands preselection 1990

1990
Countries in the Eurovision Song Contest 1990
Eurovision